Muhammad Hussain Fahimi is an ethnic Hazara politician from Afghanistan, who was the representative of the people of Sar-e Pol province in the 15th and 16th term of the Afghanistan Parliament.

Early life 
Muhammad Hussain Fahimi was born in 1963 in Balkhab districtof Sar-e-Pul Province in northern Afghanistan. He studied his religious education until his bachelor's degree in Iran and received his bachelor's degree in "Law and Political Science" from Kateb University.

See also 
 List of Hazara people

References 

Living people
1963 births
Hazara politicians
People from Sar-e Pol Province